The Bokota, also called Bogotá or Bugleres, are an indigenous people of Panama. They live in Bocas del Toro and north of Veraguas. Bokota live in the same region as the Teribe or Naso Indians. As the 2010 Census, there were 26,871 Bogota living in Panama. They are the smallest tribe in Panama and live in the west of the country. Traditionally they spoke the Bokota language, a dialect of Buglere.

Culture
The Bokota dedicate themselves to livestock, fishing, and hunting. They still use weapons like bows and arrows and spears or fishnets. Men wear shirts of manta-sucia, while women dress similar to the Ngobes. They wear necklaces, facial paint of black and red, and shiny hair combs. They make hats of vegetable fibers, backpacks, baskets, and daily dresses called cobo. They live in round houses on stilts. They are monogamous, and the Bokotas have often intermarried with the Ngöbe Buglés. There are still fullblood families of Bokota. Many traditional ceremonies are maintained, including the ceremony of lightning, which prevents lightning from striking their houses.

Language
They speak the Bokota language, also called Buglere, which is one of the Chibchan languages.

See also
Ngäbe–Buglé people

Notes

Indigenous peoples of Central America
Ethnic groups in Panama
Indigenous peoples in Panama